Cymaenes is a genus of skippers in the family Hesperiidae.

Species
Recognised species include:
 Cymaenes aequatoria (Hayward, 1940)
 Cymaenes edata (Plötz, 1882)
 Cymaenes isus (Godman, 1900)
 Cymaenes laureolus (Schaus, 1913)
 Cymaenes lochius Plötz, 1882
 Cymaenes loxa Evans, 1955
 Cymaenes lumina (Herrich-Schäffer, 1869)
 Cymaenes miqua (Dyar, 1913)
 Cymaenes psyllus (Mabille, 1898)
 Cymaenes sipariana Kaye, 1925
 Cymaenes tripunctus (Herrich-Schäffer, 1865)

Former species
Cymaenes corescene (Stoll, 1782) - synonymized to Cymaenes lumina (Herrich-Schäffer, 1869)
Cymaenes fraus Godman, 1900 - transferred to Vidius fraus (Godman, 1900)
Cymaenes odilia (Burmeister, 1878) - synonymized to Cymaenes lumina (Herrich-Schäffer, 1869)
Cymaenes trebius (Mabille, 1891) - synonymized to Cymaenes lumina (Herrich-Schäffer, 1869)

References

Natural History Museum Lepidoptera genus database

Hesperiinae
Hesperiidae genera